Galaxies is a science fiction novel written by Barry N. Malzberg.
It was first published in 1975. Galaxies  is a metafictional work in which  the writing of a science fiction novel becomes entwined with the novel being written.

Malzberg expanded his short work A Galaxy Called Rome into the full-length novel Galaxies.

References

1975 American novels
1975 science fiction novels
American science fiction novels
Metafictional novels
Pyramid Books books